Reptilase time (RT) is a blood test used to detect deficiency or abnormalities in fibrinogen, especially in cases of heparin contamination.

Reptilase, an enzyme found in the venom of Bothrops snakes, has activity similar to thrombin. Unlike thrombin, reptilase is resistant to inhibition by antithrombin III. Thus, the reptilase time is not prolonged in blood samples containing heparin, hirudin, or direct thrombin inhibitors, whereas the thrombin time will be prolonged in these samples. Reptilase also differs from thrombin by releasing fibrinopeptide A, but not fibrinopeptide B, in its cleavage of fibrinogen.

References

Blood tests